Ardian Cuculi (born 19 July 1987) is a Macedonian professional footballer of Albanian origin who plays as a defender for Kosovo club Drita. He also holds Albanian citizenship.

Aside from football he is also a law graduate after gaining his degree in January 2010 from The FON University.

Club career

Shkëndija
Cuculi went on trial at Croatian club HNK Rijeka in the summer of 2012 but returned to Shkëndija for the 2012–13 season.

He was named in the 2013–14 Macedonian First League team of the year while at Shkëndija.

Partizani Tirana
Cuculi followed coach Shpëtim Duro on his way out of Shkëndija to Albanian Superliga side Partizani Tirana ahead of the 2014-15 season.

He made his debut for the club on 24 August in the opening week of 2014–15 Albanian Superliga against Laçi, playing full-90 minutes in a 1–1 draw. He scored his maiden goal for his new side in the first leg of 2014–15 Albanian Cup second round versus Lushnja, netting in a 79th minute via a free kick. He also wore the captain armband in the match.

Cuculi appeared in 32 league matches in the 2014–15 season, and left the club at the end of May 2015 after his contract run out.

Return at Shkëndija
On 6 June 2015, Cuculi returned to his first club Shkëndija by inking a two-year contract.

In the 2017–18 season, Cuculi made 30 league appearances as Shkëndija won the championship for the second time in history. He also played in five cup matches as the tournament ended in conquest, meaning that the team has completed an unforeseen domestic double.

On 18 June 2018, Cuculi announced his departure from club along with team captain Ferhan Hasani, with the players refusing to sign contract extensions.

Kukësi
On 13 August 2018, Kukësi announced to have signed Cuculi on a one-year contract, marking the return of the defender in the Albanian Superliga after three years. The player will reportedly earn €4,000 per month and various bonuses based on club's objectives. Cuculi made his official debut in the opening week of 2018–19 Albanian Superliga against Laçi, playing full-90 minutes as the match ended in a 1–1 draw. He captained Kukësi for the first time on 15 September in the 1–0 win at Teuta Durrës due to absence of Ylli Shameti.

International career

Cuculi earned his first cap for Macedonia on 26 May 2014 in a friendly match against Cameroon, entering in the field in 26th minute by replacing the injured Goran Popov as the team lost 2–0.

Career statistics

Club

International

Honours

Club
Shkëndija
Macedonian First Football League: 2010–11, 2017–18
Macedonian Second Football League: 2009–10
Macedonian Football Cup: 2017–18
Macedonian Football Supercup: 2011

Individual
Macedonian First League team of the year: 2013–14

References

External links
 

1987 births
Living people
People from Kičevo
Albanian footballers from North Macedonia
Association football defenders
Macedonian footballers
North Macedonia youth international footballers
North Macedonia international footballers
FK Vëllazërimi 77 players
KF Shkëndija players
FK Pobeda players
FK Milano Kumanovo players
FK Partizani Tirana players
FK Kukësi players
FC Drita players
Macedonian First Football League players
Kategoria Superiore players
Football Superleague of Kosovo players
Macedonian expatriate footballers
Expatriate footballers in Albania
Macedonian expatriate sportspeople in Albania
Expatriate footballers in Kosovo
Macedonian expatriate sportspeople in Kosovo